The 12901 / 12902 Mumbai Central–Ahmedabad Gujarat Mail is a Superfast train belonging to Indian Railways that runs between  and  in India. It is a daily service. It operates as train number 12901 from Mumbai Central to Ahmedabad and as train number 12902 in the reverse direction. It operates with LHB coach since 10 September 2016. Despite leaving before Mumbai Central–Hapa Duronto Express, it reaches the destination 30 minutes after the Duronto Express.

Coaches

The Gujarat Mail has 1 AC 1st Class, 3 AC 2 tier, 7 AC 3 tier, 7 Sleeper class, 4 General class coaches & 2 Generator vans. As with most train services in India, coach composition may be amended at the discretion of Indian Railways depending on demand.

Service

It is a daily train & covers the distance of 491 kilometres in 8 hours 35 mins as 12901 Gujarat Mail (57.20 km/hr) & 8 hours 25 mins as 12902 Gujarat Mail (58.34 km/hr).

Stoppage

Traction

Dual-traction WCAM 2/2P locos would haul the train between Mumbai Central & Ahmedabad. Western Railways completed DC electric conversion to AC on 5 February 2012. It is now regularly hauled by a Vadodara-based WAP-7 locomotive.

Trivia

 It was one of the most prestigious trains on the Western Railways network but its journey time has now increased considerably. Despite being an old prestigious train equipped with LHB coach, Gujarat Mail now leaves before Rajkot–Mumbai Duronto Express, but reaches the final destination 30 minutes after the Duronto Express.
 The Gujarat Mail is a daily service which was originally numbered 1DN/ 2UP.
 Earlier, it would carry a mail coach from which it likely derived its name. This mail coach has now been transferred to the 19143/44 Lok Shakti Express.
 It is an extremely popular train with the Angadia community & is known as the Angadia Express within its circles.

Gallery

Time Table
12901 Mumbai Central–Ahmedabad Gujarat Mail leaves Mumbai Central at 22:05 PM IST on a daily basis and reaches Ahmedabad at 06:35 AM IST on the next day.
12902 Ahmedabad–Mumbai Central Gujarat Mail leaves Ahmedabad at 22:00 PM IST on a daily basis and reaches Mumbai Central at 06:25 AM IST on the next day.

Sister trains
 Gujarat Queen
 Karnavati Express
 Mumbai Central–Ahmedabad Double Decker Express
 Mumbai Central–Ahmedabad Passenger
 Mumbai Central–Ahmedabad Shatabdi Express

References

External links
 http://epaper.timesofindia.com dated 4 July 2013 (Mumbai edition)
Gujarat Mail Time-Table India Rail Info

Mumbai–Ahmedabad trains
Named passenger trains of India
Mail trains in India